Events in the year 2021 in East Timor.

Incumbents
President: Francisco Guterres
Prime Minister: Taur Matan Ruak

Events

Ongoing — COVID-19 pandemic in East Timor

April – Cyclone Seroja makes landfall in Indonesia and East Timor. As of 5 April 2021, it was estimated that at least 27 people in East Timor had died in landslides and flash floods as a result of the storm, most of them in Dili.
 December  – 2021 Timor Leste earthquake

Deaths

References

 

 
2020s in East Timor
Years of the 21st century in East Timor
East Timor
East Timor